Ellen Renee Stofan (born February 24, 1961) is Under Secretary for Science and Research at The Smithsonian and was previously the John and Adrienne Mars Director of the National Air and Space Museum.

As a planetary geologist, Stofan served as Chief Scientist of NASA and as principal advisor to NASA Administrator Charles Bolden on the agency's science programs, planning and investments. Previously, she was vice president of Proxemy Research in Laytonsville, Maryland, and as an honorary professor in the Earth sciences department at the University College London.

Early life and education
Ellen Stofan is the daughter of Andrew J. Stofan, a rocket engineer who worked for NASA in a number of roles including director of the NASA Lewis Research Center and associate administrator for NASA's Space Station Office.

Ellen Stofan received her Bachelor of Science degree in geology from the College of William & Mary in 1983 and went on to earn masters and doctorate degrees from Brown University.  Her doctoral thesis, accepted in 1989, was titled "Geology of coronae and domal structures on Venus and models of their origin."

Career 
Stofan's research has focused on the geology of Venus, Mars, Saturn's moon Titan, and Earth. She is an associate member of the Cassini mission to Saturn Radar Team and a co-investigator on the Mars Express Mission's MARSIS sounder. She was also the principal investigator on the Titan Mare Explorer, a proposed mission for a floating lander to be sent to Titan. From 1991 through 2000, she held a number of senior scientist positions at NASA's Jet Propulsion Laboratory in Pasadena, California, including chief scientist for NASA's New Millennium Program, deputy project scientist for the Magellan Mission to Venus, and experiment scientist for Spaceborne Imaging Radar-C (SIR-C), an instrument that provided radar images of Earth on two Space Shuttle flights in 1994. Stofan has written and published numerous professional papers, books and book chapters, and has chaired committees including the National Academy's Inner Planets Panel for the 2009-2011 Planetary Science Decadal Survey and the Venus Exploration Analysis Group.

She began her tenure in April 2018 as the John and Adrienne Mars Director of the National Air and Space Museum and was the first female Director of the museum.

In November 2020, Stofan was named a member of the Joe Biden presidential transition Agency Review Team to support transition efforts related to the National Aeronautics and Space Administration. In March  2021, she became the Under Secretary for Science and Research at The Smithsonian.

Awards and honors
Among her many awards, Stofan received the Presidential Early Career Award for Scientists and Engineers (PECASE) in 1996. In 2022, the asteroid 328677 Stofan was named in her honor.

 Honorary Doctor of Science, University of Iowa, 2020
 Honorary Doctor of Science, Worcester Polytechnic Institute, 2019
 Honorary Doctor of Science, Washington & Jefferson College, 2016
 Honorary Doctor of Science, College of William & Mary, 2016
 Fellow, American Association for the Advancement of Science, 2023

Selected publications

See also
List of women in leadership positions on astronomical instrumentation projects

References

External links
William & Mary News & Events: Alumna Ellen Stofan ’83 to be NASA’s chief scientist
SpaceNews Profile: Ellen Stofan, NASA Chief Scientist

1961 births
20th-century American women scientists
20th-century  American geologists
21st-century American geologists
21st-century American women scientists
American women geologists
Brown University alumni
College of William & Mary alumni
Directors of museums in the United States
Living people
NASA people
People from Oberlin, Ohio
Planetary scientists
Scientists from Ohio
Women museum directors
Women planetary scientists
Recipients of the Presidential Early Career Award for Scientists and Engineers
Fellows of the American Association for the Advancement of Science